The 1982 Basque Pelota World Championships were the 9th edition of the Basque Pelota World Championships organized by  the FIPV.

Participating nations

Others

Events
A total of 12 events were disputed, in 4 playing areas.

Trinquete, 5 events disputed

Fronton (30 m), 2 events disputed

Fronton (36 m), 4 events disputed

Fronton (54 m), 1 event disputed

Medal table

References

World Championships,1982
1982 in sports
Sport in Mexico City
1982 in Mexican sports
International sports competitions hosted by Mexico
Pelota Championships
World Championships,1982